Jeffrey Sayle (born 1 October 1954) is a former Grand Prix motorcycle road racer from Australia. His best year was in 1980 when he finished in fifth place in the 350cc world championship. Sayle also competed at the Isle of Man TT races.

Career statistics

By season

References

Living people
1954 births
Sportsmen from New South Wales
Australian motorcycle racers
250cc World Championship riders
350cc World Championship riders
500cc World Championship riders
Isle of Man TT riders